Lester Benjamin (born 14 September 1963) is an Antiguan and Barbudan retired long jumper.

Career
Benjamin competed at the 1983 World Championships, the 1984 Olympic Games and the 1987 World Championships, but did not reach the final round. He finished fourth in the long jump at the 1983 and 1987 Pan American Games.

His personal best jump was 8.02 metres, achieved in May 1984 in Baton Rouge. This is the national record.

Achievements

References

External links
 

1963 births
Living people
Antigua and Barbuda male sprinters
Antigua and Barbuda male long jumpers
Antigua and Barbuda male triple jumpers
Athletes (track and field) at the 1984 Summer Olympics
Olympic athletes of Antigua and Barbuda
Athletes (track and field) at the 1983 Pan American Games
Athletes (track and field) at the 1987 Pan American Games
Pan American Games competitors for Antigua and Barbuda
World Athletics Championships athletes for Antigua and Barbuda